Peer feedback is a practice where feedback is given by one student to another. Peer feedback provides students opportunities to learn from each other. After students finish a writing assignment but before the assignment is handed in to the instructor for a grade,  the students have to  work together to check each other's work and give comments to the peer partner. Comments from peers are called as peer feedback. Peer feedback can be in the form of corrections, opinions, suggestions, or ideas to each other. Ideally, peer feedback is a two-way process in which one cooperates with the other.

Definition
Peer feedback  involves providing opportunities for students to talk and listen, write, read meaningfully, and reflect on the content, ideas, issues, and concerns of an academic subject. Peer feedback can be defined as "a communication process through which learners enter into dialogues related to performance and standards." Peers should look for missing details, ask questions about parts that are confusing, and praise what they enjoyed. Peer feedback may be referred to by many terms such as peer evaluation, peer critiquing, peer editing, or peer response. Some researchers consider peer feedback as an effective technique for the development of the students' writing whilst others promote its use in oral presentation activities.  Others prefer instructor feedback to peer feedback.

Benefits
According to Atay and Kurt, there are positive effects to peer feedback in a classroom setting. First, it provides diversity with teaching compared with the traditional way of giving teacher feedback. In peer feedback sessions, students do not just listen to teacher instructions, but work with their peers and tend to get more practice. Students' anxiety may become lower which can increase learning motivation.

Second, sharing opinions with peers is helpful in building and increasing one's confidence. Clearly expressing what one is trying to say requires confidence and sufficient knowledge; people need to self dress what to say with their own knowledge or experiences. Thus, giving useful feedback definitely strengthens one's confidence. Moreover, peer feedback helps student to take more responsibilities in learning process. Besides doing assignments, students have to read others' work carefully as well so that one is not only responsible for his/her own work but also the others'.

When peer feedback is established it allows students to interact with their peers and creates high social skills while learning material more effectively.  Interaction with other students allows students to have better social approaches when interacting. Learning by peer feedback gives students more of an opportunity to work as a unit instead of individuals working alone. Working in groups gives students more useful life skill that well help prepare them for the future. Peer feedback gives more control to the student, the student can decide if they want to use the criticism their peers are giving them or not. When given options more students are more likely to give and absorb more feedback. Peer feedback has confirmed an increase in affect; students that have increasing responsibilities have more drive towards their work and a spike in confidence. Furthermore, Kristanto (2018) found that peer feedback is an essential element of peer assessment. In peer assessment, feedback from peers can provide suggestions or correction for students' future works as companion of the received grade.

In addition, peer feedback reduces writing anxiety, especially in ESL students, and in effect improves the quality of their writing. Student’s awareness of their mistakes through their friend's opinions and the collaboration reduces anxiety.  Peer feedback enlightens student's awareness of the similar difficulties and weaknesses in writing their peers encounter and eventually motivates and builds their self-confidence, reducing writing anxiety. Peer feedback effectively compliments teacher feedback for quality writing  According to Jahin (2012) ESL students enjoy "social, cognitive, affective, and methodological benefits".  Peer feedback thereby offers students a sense of audience, which increases their motivation and confidence in writing. The multiple reviews through peer feedback improve the quality of the ESL student’s writing. Hussein and Al Ashri (2013) explained that peer feedback can skill students into excellent writers as student’s apprehension to write the first time, eventually melts away. 

Also, peer review is helpful because it develops students and makes them read and comment on each other to improve the process of writing with their peers. They can all feel the joy of sharing their comments and their writing within the group. Therefore, students become more confidence about their writing. However, Urzua reminds us of how crucial is the question of training learners to cope with the task of evaluating their peers. Students may not be able to ask constructive questions for redrafting.

Limitations
However, there are some drawbacks of peer feedback, too.  According to Connor and Asenavage's study in 1994, they found that teacher feedback has more influences on students' writing work.  Only 5 percent of peer feedback influences the work. Students respect and respond more to their teacher's feedback rather than their peers' feedback, and they often take peer feedback for granted so that they do not make corrections based on it. Thus, the teachers' strict requirement on students to do revisions is crucial for how students treat either teacher feedback or peer feedback.

In addition, some students actually lack ability to give peer feedback owing to insufficient knowledge. In this case, students hardly learn from others, so peer feedback loses track of its original rationale to help the other get improvement.

Need for additional training
However, it is noted in several studies the difficulty in having students self-assess.  One of the greatest difficulties is the accuracy of scores.  Orsmond, Merry, and Reiling (1997) found that students often misjudged their assessments. Using a science class assessment project, they compared students' self-assessment scores with those of the teacher. They found that there was an overall disagreement between the markings of 86%, with 56% of students over-marking and 30% under-marking. They also noted a general trend of poor students tending to over-mark their work while the good students tended to under-mark their work.

Sadler (1989) counteracts these difficulties by emphasizing the need for teacher to pass the responsibility of assessment to the student through a process of students becoming a trainee in assessment.  The teacher's role is to guide the student in critical evaluation of their learning. Providing guided but direct and authentic evaluative experience for students enables them to develop their evaluative knowledge, thereby bringing them within the guild of people who are able to determine quality using multiple criteria. It also enables transfer of some of the responsibility for making decisions from teacher to learner.

A study by McDonald and Boud (2003) investigated whether introducing self-assessment training would affect student learning, specifically on how they perform on external measures of achievement. Teachers were trained in self-assessment practices and then they introduced the practices to their students. In the end, both the student and the teachers responded well to the self-assessment practices. On average, students who were trained in self-assessment strategies outperformed their peers in all curriculum are assessments. The students also reported that the practices were not only helpful on the external assessments, but that they also impacted their perceptions of their classroom learning.

This was reaffirmed by Orsmond, Merry, and Reiling (2000) who implemented a method of student self and peer assessment involving student constructed marking criteria with a poster presentation in a biology class. In an evaluative questionnaire at the end of the project, 84% of students stated the exercise (self-assessment reflective practices) had been beneficial, made them think more and become more critical.  Some 68% of the students felt they had learned more and had gained confidence.

Impact of cultural differences
Based on Allaei and Connor's finding (1990), students' view of peer feedback can be very different due to cultural differences, so the effectiveness of using peer feedback will not be the same in different situations.  For example, Chinese students learning English are more likely to welcome peer feedback than people from western countries because Chinese culture encourages working together and maintaining harmony in a group.  In contrast, the Western culture encourages individual study.  Therefore, it is assumed that peer feedback may be more useful in Chinese learning environment than in Western countries.

See also
Peer education
Peer-led team learning
Peer-mediated instruction
Peer mentoring
Peer tutor

Notes

References

 Atay, D. & Kurt, G. (2006). "Prospective Teachers and L2 Writing Anxiety". Asian EFL Journal, 8 (4), pp. 100–118.
 Atay, D. & Kurt, G. (2007). "The Effects of Peer Feedback on the Writing Anxiety of Prospective Turkish Teachers of EFL". Journal of Theory and Practice in Education 3 (1). pp. 12–23.
 Guardado, M., & Shi, L. (2007). "ESL Students’ Experiences of Online Peer Feedback". Computers and Composition, 24(4), 444-462.
 Hussein, M., & Al Ashri, I. (2013). The Effectiveness of Writing Conferences and Peer Response Groups Strategies on the EFL Secondary Students' Writing Performance and Their Self Efficacy (A Comparative Study). Online Submission
 Institute for Writing and Rhetoric. (n.d.). Retrieved from https://writing-speech.dartmouth.edu/teaching/first-year-writing-pedagogies-methods-design/diagnosing-and-responding-student-writing
 Jahin, J. H. (2012). The Effect of Peer Reviewing on Writing Apprehension and Essay Writing Ability of Prospective EFL Teachers. Australian Journal of Teacher Education, 37(11). 
 Keh, C (1990). Feedback in the writing process: A model and methods for implementation, ELT Journal, 44(4), 294-304.
 Kristanto, Y. D. (2018). Technology-enhanced pre-instructional peer assessment: Exploring students’ perceptions in a Statistical Methods course. REiD (Research and Evaluation in Education), 4(2), 105-116. https://doi.org/10.21831/reid.v4i2.20951
 Lacy, KW. (1989). Treasure hunt: A student-centred to ESL writing. In V. Bickley (Ed.) Language Teaching and Learning Styles within and across Culture. Hong Kong: Education Department. 
 Lin, G. H. C. & Chien, P. S. C. (2009) "An Investigation into Effectiveness of Peer Feedback." Journal of Applied Foreign Languages Fortune Institute of Technology, Taiwan, vol. 3. pp. 79–87.
 Lin, S., Liu, E. & Yuan, S. (2001). "Web-based Peer Assessment: Feedback for Students with Various Thinking-styles". Journal of Computer Assisted Learning 17. pp. 420–432.
 Liu, N. F., & Carless, D. (2006). Peer feedback: the learning element of peer assessment. Teaching in Higher education, 11(3), 279-290.
 McDonald, B., & Boud, D. (2003). The impact of self-assessment on achievement: The effects of self-assessment training on performance in external examinations. Assessment in Education, 10, pp. 209–220.
 Meyers, C., & Jones, T. B. (1993). Promoting Active Learning. Strategies for the College Classroom. Jossey-Bass Inc., Publishers, 350 Sansome Street, San Francisco, CA 94104.
 Miao, Y., Badger, R. & Zhen Y. (2006) A Comparative Study of Peer and Teacher Feedback in a Chinese EFL Writing Class.
 Orsmond, P., Merry, S., & Reiling, K. (1997). A study in self-assessment: Tutor and students’ perceptions of performance criteria. Assessment and Evaluation in Higher Education, 22, pp. 357–370.
 Orsmond, P., Merry, S., & Reiling K. (2000). The use of student derived marking criteria in peer and self-assessment. Assessment and Evaluation in Higher Education, 25, pp. 23–38.
 Sadler, D. R. (1989). Formative assessment and the design of instructional systems. Instructional Science, 18, pp. 119–144.
 Tseng, S. & Tsai, C. (2007). "On-line Peer Assessment and the Role of the Peer Feedback: A Study of High School Computer Course". Journal of Computers & Education 49, pp. 1161–1174.
 Urzua, C. (1987). " You Stopped Too Soon": Second Language Children Composing and Revising. TESOL quarterly, 279-304.
 van Ginkel, S., Gulikers, J., Biemans, H. & Mulder, M. (2016) Fostering oral presentation performance: does the quality of feedback differ when provided by the teacher, peers or peers guided by tutor? Assessment & Evaluation in Higher Education, 42(6), pp.1-14.
 Wakabayashi, R. (2013). The Effects of the Peer Feedback Process on Reviewers' Own Writing. English Language Teaching, 6(9), 177.

Language-teaching methodology
Peer learning